Merisi is a surname. Notable people with the surname include:

 Michelangelo Merisi da Caravaggio (1571–1610), Italian painter
 Emanuele Merisi (born 1972), Italian swimmer
 Giuseppe Merisi (born 1938), Italian bishop

Italian-language surnames